Crystal Emmanuel (born November 27, 1991) is a Canadian sprinter who specialises in the 200 metres. She is the Canadian champion in both the 100m and 200m as of July 2018. Crystal also holds the 200m record for Canada, having broken a record that stood for 34 years. She competed in this event at the 2012, 2016 and 2020 Summer Olympics, but was eliminated in the semi-finals. At the 2013 World Championships in Athletics, she was eliminated in the heats after being disqualified for a lane infringement.

She has also run as part of the Canadian 4 x 100 m relay team, and is part of the team that holds the Canadian record.  Set at the 2015 World Championships, Emmanuel ran the first leg of the relay.  It broke the Canadian record set at the 2013 World Championships, where Emmanuel also ran the lead off leg.

When Emmanuel won the 100 and 200 m titles at the Canadian Championships in 2011, she was the first woman to win both events since 2003.  She repeated the feat in 2016, 2017 and 2018.  Her race in the 200 m final at the 2017 World Championship was the first time a Canadian woman ran in the World Championship 200 m final since 1983.

Her 100 m personal best was set at the 2018 NANAC Championships.

Her mother Rosalind Emmanuel competed internationally for Barbados in athletics in the 1980s.

Competition record

Personal bests
Outdoor
100 metres – 11.11 (+0.9 m/s, Toronto 2018)
200 metres – 22.50 (+0.0 m/s, Cork 2017) NR
Indoor
60 metres – 7.23 (New York 2016)
200 metres – 23.42 (New York 2020)

References

External links

 
 
 

1991 births
Living people
Canadian people of Barbadian descent
Sportspeople from Scarborough, Toronto
Canadian female sprinters
Black Canadian female track and field athletes
Olympic track and field athletes of Canada
Athletes (track and field) at the 2012 Summer Olympics
Athletes (track and field) at the 2016 Summer Olympics
Commonwealth Games competitors for Canada
Athletes (track and field) at the 2014 Commonwealth Games
Athletes (track and field) at the 2018 Commonwealth Games
Pan American Games medalists in athletics (track and field)
Pan American Games silver medalists for Canada
Pan American Games bronze medalists for Canada
Athletes (track and field) at the 2015 Pan American Games
Athletes (track and field) at the 2019 Pan American Games
Pan American Games track and field athletes for Canada
World Athletics Championships athletes for Canada
Canadian Track and Field Championships winners
Medalists at the 2015 Pan American Games
Medalists at the 2019 Pan American Games
Athletes from Toronto
Athletes (track and field) at the 2020 Summer Olympics
Olympic female sprinters
20th-century Canadian women
21st-century Canadian women